Bentiu Airport is an airport in South Sudan. It is located just north of Rubkona, a town that sits across the Bahr el Ghazal River from Bentiu.

Location
Bentiu Airport  is located in Rubkon County in Northern Liech, just north of the town of Rubkona, near the International border with the Republic of Sudan. The airport is located about  directly north of Bentiu.

The geographic coordinates of this airport are: 9° 18' 12.60"N, 29° 47' 13.92"E (Latitude: 9.30350; Longitude: 29.78720). The airport has a single unpaved runway, the dimensions of which are 1300 x 23 metres, or 4264 x 75 feet.

Overview
Bentiu Airport is a small civilian and military airport that serves the town of Bentiu and surrounding communities.

See also
 List of airports in South Sudan

References

External links
 Location of Bentiu Airport At Google Maps

Airports in South Sudan
Unity (state)
Greater Upper Nile